Chilean Heart (Spanish: Corazón del Chileno, lit. Chilean's Heart) is a FIRST robotics team based in Santiago, Santiago Metropolitan Region, Chile. It has participated in the Los Angeles and Great Lakes regionals. Team members come from different schools in Chile.

Creation and 2008 season
Team 2576 was created at the end of 2007, with the purpose of getting more school students into engineering and technology programs. José Ignacio Fernandez, an engineering student from Andrés Bello University had the idea, and then he contacted several people to introduce them into the project. The result: More than 25 students from the whole country formed the original team. In 2008 the team had its first competition in the Great Lakes Regional, in Ypsilanti, Michigan where the team won the Rookie Inspiration Award.

2009 and 2010
Many of the original members and sponsors left the team after its first season, and more than 30 new members became the 2009 generation, who faced the Lunacy challenge. For this season, and since then, the team have been going to Los Angeles, California, to Los Angeles Regional.

In 2010 Chile was hit by a powerful earthquake, and it carried many difficulties for team 2576, who had to face many personal tragedies, and lost some sponsors. The team delegation for the competition was made of only 12 members who, after all, had a good performance with the help of other teams in LA.

On 2010, the team began working into the constitution of a new non-profit corporation, Corazón Tecnológico y Científico de Chile.

2011 season
During the Logo Motion build season, the team built a tennis ball shooting robot which appeared in a clinic during the 2011 Movistar Open featuring Nicolás Massú.

Two months later the team 2576 won "The Judges Award" in Los Angeles Regional. After 2011 season and once back in Chile, the team led many educational and social projects, with successful results.

2012 season
The team had a great performance in the competition, with many new members and great sponsors, as SABIC Polymershapes and the Chilean philanthropist Leonardo Farkas. In the LA regional, the team won the Team Spirit Award and José Ignacio "Nacho" Fernández, team 2576's founder mentor, won the Woodie Flowers Finalist Award.

Team

Coach: Leonel Lagos (2010, present). Former coaches: Georg Gromsch (2007-2008), José Ignacio Fernández (2009-2010)

Advisor: José Ignacio Fernández (2007–present)

Team Captains: Nicolas Marticorena (2013–present), José Manuel Gómez (2010–present). Former captains: Bastián Palacio (2009-2010, now team mentor), Christián Acuña (2009-2010, now team mentor), Teresa Paneque (2012).

References

External links
Team Official Webpage (EN)
Team Official Webpage (ES)
Team Twitter page
Official Facebook page

FIRST Robotics Competition teams